The 1945–46 British Victory Home Championship was played during the 1945–46 football season between the national football teams of the four Home Nations of the British Isles. It was won by Scotland. Staged very soon after the end of World War II hostilities, the matches are not regarded as full internationals and are referred to as Victory Internationals.

Table

Results

See also
Association football during World War II
England national football team results (unofficial matches)
List of Scotland wartime international footballers
Scotland national football team results (unofficial matches)

References

1946 in British sport
1945–46 in Welsh football
1945 in British sport
1945–46 in English football
1945–46 in Scottish football
1945-46
Wartime association football
1945–46 in Northern Ireland association football